Arena is the nineteenth studio album by rock musician Todd Rundgren that was released in 2008.

Like several of his earlier albums, this was entirely a solo effort, with Rundgren playing all the instruments. In contrast to his earlier albums, he produced this album entirely on an Apple laptop computer using Propellerhead's Reason software for composition and Sonoma Wire Works' RiffWorks for recording. All audio processing was done with software tools as well, except for a Line 6 Toneport guitar input box.

Track listing
All tracks are written by Todd Rundgren.
 "Mad" – 3:35
 "Afraid" – 4:52
 "Mercenary" – 4:02
 "Gun" – 3:54
 "Courage" – 3:44
 "Weakness" – 5:15
 "Strike" – 3:29
 "Pissin" – 4:39
 "Today" – 5:22
 "Bardo" – 6:13
 "Mountaintop" – 4:18
 "Panic" – 3:11
 "Manup" – 4:00

Personnel
 Todd Rundgren - all vocals and instruments, producer, engineer, cover art design

References

Todd Rundgren albums
2008 albums
Albums produced by Todd Rundgren